2C-T-15 or 2,5-dimethoxy-4-(β-cyclopropylthio)phenethylamine is a psychedelic phenethylamine of the 2C family.  It was presumably first synthesized by Alexander Shulgin and reported in his book PiHKAL (Phenethylamines i Have Known And Loved).

Chemistry
2C-T-15 is the 2 carbon homologue of Aleph-15, which has not been synthesized.  The full chemical name is 2-[4-(2-cyclopropylthio)-2,5-dimethoxyphenyl]ethanamine.  The drug has structural properties similar to 2C-T-2 and other drugs in the 2C-T series.

General information
The dosage range of 2C-T-15 is typically 30 mg or more.  Its duration is unspecified by Shulgin, and its entry in PiHKAL says it lasts for "several hours."  The effects are not prominent, and 2C-T-15 is not very potent.

Pharmacology
The mechanism that produces 2C-T-15's hallucinogenic and entheogenic effects has not been specifically established, however it is most likely to result from action as a 5-HT2A serotonin receptor agonist in the brain, a mechanism of action shared by all of the hallucinogenic tryptamines and phenethylamines for which the mechanism of action is known.

Dangers
The toxicity of 2C-T-15 is not well documented.  2C-T-15 is much less potent than 2C-T-7, but it may be expected that at very high doses it would display similar toxicity to that of other phenethylamines of the 2C-T family.

Legality
2C-T-15 is not explicitly illegal in the USA, but possession and sales of 2C-T-15 could be prosecuted under the Federal Analog Act because of its structural similarities to 2C-T-7.

2C-T-15 is a class A drug in the UK under the Misuse of Drugs act.

As of October 31, 2016, 2C-T-15 is a controlled substance (Schedule III) in Canada.

References

External links
 PiHKAL #47 2C-T-15
 2C-T-15 Entry in PiHKAL • info

2C (psychedelics)
Thioethers
Cyclopropyl compounds